American actress, model, musician, and singer-songwriter Zooey Deschanel made her film debut in the 1999 comedy feature Mumford. She went on to gain public attention by co-starring in the comedy-drama Almost Famous (2000), the independent drama Manic (2001) opposite Joseph Gordon-Levitt, and the comedy drama The Good Girl (2002). She landed her first major role as an 18-year-old virgin in the romantic drama All the Real Girls (2003), for which she was nominated for an Independent Spirit Award for Best Female Lead. One of Deschanel's biggest commercial successes came with the Christmas-fantasy film Elf (2003), which grossed over $220 million worldwide.

In 2005, Deschanel played Tricia McMillan in Garth Jennings' The Hitchhiker's Guide to the Galaxy, an adaption of the media franchise of the same name. She followed this with a series of comedy films, including Winter Passing (2005), Failure to Launch (2006), The Go-Getter (2007), and Peyton Reed's Yes Man (2008). Deschanel played a radiant dream girl in the independent romantic drama (500) Days of Summer (2009), also opposite Gordon-Levitt, for which she garnered a nomination for Best Actress in a Motion Picture at the 14th Satellite Awards. She voiced Bridget in the animated family comedy Trolls (2016), which earned her an Annie Award nomination for Voice Acting in a Feature Production.

Deschanel made her television debut in the sitcom Veronica's Closet in 1998. She later starred as DG in the miniseries Tin Man (2007), a science fiction re-imagining of The Wonderful Wizard of Oz. The miniseries averaged more than 6.3 million viewers during its first night, making it the top rated cable miniseries of 2007. She voiced Mary Spuckler in three episodes of The Simpsons, since debuting in the 2008 episode "Apocalypse Cow", and guest-starred with her sister Emily in a 2009 episode of the Fox crime procedural drama Bones. In 2011, she landed a starring role in the Fox sitcom New Girl. For her portrayal as goofy school teacher Jessica Day, she received nominations for three Golden Globe Awards and a Primetime Emmy Award, and won the Critics' Choice Television Award for Best Actress in a Comedy Series.

Film

Television

Music videos

Video games

Discography

Soundtrack performances

Guest album appearances

Notes

References

External links
 

Actress filmographies
American filmographies